Kevin Poon is a Hong Kong entrepreneur, fashion designer and DJ.  He is the co-founder of Hong Kong's streetwear brand CLOT in 2003. He also launched JUICE, an international retailer with outlets across Asia including Hong Kong, Shanghai and Taipei.  Poon launched District Distribution in 2011 in Hong Kong, China and Southeast Asia, and then founded Social/Capital, a marketing and public relations agency in 2012.

In 2013, Poon opened WOAW, a multi-purpose art space in Hong Kong. WOAW Gallery has hosted different exhibitions including debut solo shows in Asia for rising stars in the art world including Koichi Sato, Cristina Banban, and Charlie Roberts.

In 2014, Poon launched a coffee shop called ‘Elephant Grounds’ in the back of the WOAW store, which now has branches in BeiJing, GuangZhou and ChengDu.

Early life and education
Poon was born in Hong Kong but moved to Chicago in the United States when he was three years old. He returned to Hong Kong when he was five briefly before moving to Vancouver.  Returning to Hong Kong again, Poon studied at the Hong Kong International School before moving to North America after graduating high school to attend Pepperdine University in California. While in Los Angeles, Poon worked as an intern for Interscope Records when he was 19 years old and later earned a degree in finance from Pepperdine. He returned to Hong Kong in 2003 to start his own business with Edison Chen, creating CLOT.

Career

2003 – 2011: CLOT and JUICE 
Poon and childhood friend Edison Chen founded fashion label CLOT in 2003 shortly after Poon graduated from Pepperdine University. Aside from fashion, CLOT has tapped into various aspects of youth culture including music, art and design. In 2004, Poon opened JUICE, a retail store specializing in designer streetwear and accessories. CLOT products have a strong presence in the numerous JUICE stores located across Asia. By 2006, CLOT had made its entry into the American marketplace. The brand has announced plans to continue its expansion to reach markets in major fashion hubs across the globe including New York City, Los Angeles, Paris and London.

Also in 2006, CLOT organized the Hong Kong leg of the Hennessy V.S.O.P Kanye West ‘Touch the Sky’ tour. It was West's only Asian stop on the world tour and his first time performing in Hong Kong. CLOT arranged for West to perform at what is now known as the West Kowloon Cultural District, a 200,000 square foot venue. CLOT's co-founder Edison Chen was the opening act for West.

With CLOT, Poon helped to organize the launch for luxury handbag label Coach’s flagship store opening in Hong Kong in 2008, also held in the West Kowloon Cultural District. Entertainment acts for the event included Grammy-award-winning artist John Mayer, DJ AM and original winners of America’s Best Dance Crew, the Jabbawockeez. Additionally, Poon organized the after party for the Coach event, which was held at Volar nightclub in Hong Kong and featured acts signed to French record label Ed Banger Records including Uffie, SebastiAn, Dj Mehdi, Busy P and others.

The CLOT label promotes collaboration between Eastern and Western styles. CLOT has collaborated with brands such as Nike, VLONE, sacai, Fear of God, Adidas, Converse, Lacoste, Headporter, Pepsi, and with American hip-hop artist Kanye West. The brand developed a shoe for Nike called the “Kiss of Death” which marked the first ever collaboration between Nike and a Hong Kong-based label.

From June 2010 to June 2011, Poon with JUICE collaborated with Disney to host a pop-up store called “Man in the Forest.” The project housed a collection of Disney collaborations by leading designers, including CLOT. The collaboration between CLOT and Disney represented a unique fusion between Disney symbols and Eastern design principles. The pop-up store's name was derived from a line in Disney's animated film, Bambi.

In September 2012, Poon and CLOT collaborated with Japanese brand Casio to produce the G-Shock 30th anniversary wristwatch. The product is a bright red watch with a distinctively retro design. In October 2012, CLOT unveiled the CLOT x Converse First String Pro Leather, their latest collaboration with Converse. The shoe is a rendition of Converse's iconic Pro Leather silhouette, available in high-cut and low editions. The collaboration was celebrated at JUICE in Causeway Bay, Hong Kong.

2011 – 2014: Art and Lifestyle 
Recognizing an increasing demand for international lifestyle products in the Asia market, Poon launched District Distribution LLC, a distribution company in early 2011. District Distribution focuses on distributing accessories such as bags, gadgets and footwear. Native Shoes, Herschel, Happy Socks, Kangol, Karen Walker, Le Specs, Case Scenario and Baxter of California are just some of the brands currently under the District umbrella. Through District, these brands are now distributed throughout Hong Kong, China and select cities in South-East Asia.

Aside from distribution, District builds and manages brand presence through coverage in local media and endorsements from local trend-setters and celebrities.
Following the success of its Hong Kong office, Poon opened a second District office in Taipei, Taiwan just a year later in early 2012.

Poon founded WOAW! (World of Amazing Wonders) on Gough Street in 2013. WOAW! is a concept store and gallery selling unique gadgets, stationery, accessories and other lifestyle products. The store features products from brands such as Happy Socks, Tanner Goods, Odin, Ostrich Pillow and more. There are products for men, women and children all reflecting Poon's interests and cultural influences. In 2021 WOAW gallery opened its second Hong Kong branch focusing on contemporary art exhibitions.

The store initially began as a sequence of pop-up stores around Hong Kong. Poon collaborated with optical store LensCrafters to open concept pop-up store WOAW! in 2011. The temporary space housed a collection of luxury eyewear brands including Illesteva, Karen Walker, Thierry Lasry, Subcrew by Mikli and more.

2014 – Present: Food and Beverage 
A year after WOAW! opened its permanent store location, Poon decided to convert the back of the store into a coffee shop called Elephant Grounds. Elephant Grounds features a variety of artisan coffee blends and homemade baked goods like cookies.

Poon became the creative director of the Spanish restaurant La Rambla in 2017.

Poon became a co-founder of a Japanese beef restaurant in Hong Kong called WAGYUMAFIA in 2018, along with spin-off restaurants Mashi no Mashi and YAKINIKUMAFIA.

Investor in Morty's Deli (2016), Morty's the New York-style deli, is situated on the lower ground floor in Jardine House, Central, and Starstreet, Wan Chai.

Others
For Hong Kong Social Media Week 2011, Poon was selected as a panelist at a blogging discussion, along with several other local personalities to discuss the function and future of blogging and social media. Poon maintains his own blog on the website Hypebeast, where he frequently posts updates on fashion, art, and news about upcoming events for CLOT or JUICE.

In May 2012, Poon helped organize “The Nature of Need” at Galerie Perrotin in Hong Kong, a solo exhibition of artworks by Brooklyn-based artist KAWS. In June 2012, Poon was in charge of a fashion project known as “Hello, world” with popular American fashion label J.Crew. The project was a series of videos and photo shoots which features models and designers from around the world. Poon also played a role in the J.Crew's introduction to the Asia market in October 2012, helping to organize its highly successful cocktail launch party at Hong Kong luxury department store Lane Crawford. Also in October 2012, Poon teamed up with California shoe company TOMS to organize an event at Lane Crawford's IFC store in Hong Kong. For the event, Poon arranged for artists such as Charles Muska, Prodip and Jin Meyersen to customize pairs of TOMS shoes. The shoes were then sold at a silent auction, which was also organized by Poon.

Poon co-organized Blohk Party, Hong Kong's first hip hop and dance festival, with Alex Ng in 2013. The all-day music festival was curated by Pharrell Williams and featured performances by Williams, Justice, and Busy P. The event also included local artists such as CLOT co-founder Edison Chen. Aside from showcasing DJs and hip hop performances, the festival also included cultural activities, food, and fashion.

References

Living people
Hong Kong expatriates in the United States
Hong Kong fashion designers
Year of birth missing (living people)